Breadline may refer to:

 "Breadline" (Megadeth song), a song by Megadeth
 Breadline Africa, a poverty relief organisation
 A term for the poverty threshold, the minimum level of income deemed adequate in a country
 Soup kitchen
 Rationing